SM Entertainment Co., Ltd. is a South Korean multinational entertainment agency established in 1995 by record executive and record producer Lee Soo-man. It is one of South Korea's largest entertainment companies and has been responsible for fostering and popularizing the careers of many K-pop stars garnering huge global fanbases. The company operates as a record label, talent agency, music production company, event management and concert production company, and music publishing house. SM Entertainment is known for having led the worldwide K-pop phenomenon and the musical side of "Hallyu", also known as the "Korean Wave", with early overseas successes such as H.O.T., S.E.S. and BoA.

The label currently represents K-pop artists such as TVXQ, Super Junior, Girls' Generation, J-Min, Shinee, Zhou Mi, Exo, Red Velvet, NCT, WayV, SuperM, Aespa and Got the Beat, and previously represented Hyun Jin-Young, Shinhwa, Fly to the Sky, The Grace, f(x) and Henry Lau. It also manages actors, including Kim Min-jong, Lee Jae-ryong, Yoo Ho-jeong, Cho Jun-young and previously represented Lee Yeon-hee, Go Ara. In Japan, SM co-publishes Avex Trax releases for artists including Ayumi Hamasaki, Namie Amuro, and Koda Kumi, as well as Johnny's Entertainment artists such as Arashi and KAT-TUN.

History

1989–2000: Creation and first-generation artists
After graduating from California State University, Northridge in the United States, Lee Soo-man returned to Korea and in 1989 established what was then known as "SM Studio" in the Apgujeong neighborhood of Gangnam, Seoul and signed singer Hyun Jin-young. During the 1990s, SM Studio developed an in-house system that looked after all aspects of its artists' careers. Lee's approach was targeted at teenage audiences, and took a holistic view of the qualities needed to become a successful entertainer. In February 1995, the company changed its name to SM Entertainment and set up its capital fund. SM then developed an in-house production system and created a string of successful artists, including boy band H.O.T. in 1996, girl group S.E.S. in 1997, boy band Shinhwa in 1998, R&B duo Fly to the Sky in 1999, and soloist BoA in 2000.

Jung Hae-ik was appointed CEO at the time of SM's official reestablishment in 1995,  and was succeeded by Kim Kyung-wook in 1998.

2000–2005: Affiliations and second-generation artists

The early 2000s saw the disbandment of both H.O.T (in 2001) and S.E.S (in 2002). Shinhwa departed to a new agency, and new acts like the duo Isak N Jiyeon and the boy band Black Beat failed to attain the popularity of previous SM artists. In December 2000, SM established an affiliate company called Fandango Korea. In January 2001, the company founded an overseas division, SM Entertainment Japan. Around the same time, the company was approved for listing on KOSDAQ, and SM established an affiliation with the Japanese major label Avex Trax. SM also formed the subsidiaries BM Entertainment and Cid. K Entertainment (under which the girl groups M.I.L.K. and Shinvi were signed, respectively), but they later dissolved when their groups disbanded.

In late 2002, SM was awarded the Grand Prix of Ministry of Culture and Tourism for the Culture Contents for Export Award in music.

In 2003, SM became affiliated with Starlight Corporation Ltd. and C-Cube Entertainment Corporation. That same year, the company debuted five-member boy group TVXQ. The following years saw the debuts of artists such as TRAX (2004), The Grace (2005), and Super Junior (2005).

2005–2010: Expansion and international artists

In 2005, Kim Young-min became the company's third CEO, under whom several artists debuted with a view to promoting outside of South Korea. Artists produced by SM during this period included Chinese-born soloist Zhang Liyin (2006), Japanese-language soloist J-Min (2007), Girls' Generation (2007), Shinee (2008), and f(x) (2009). In April 2008, SM debuted a Mandarin-language sub-unit of Super Junior, named Super Junior-M. In October 2008, SM announced plans for BoA's debut in the American market, under a newly formed subsidiary label named SM Entertainment USA.

In May 2008, the SM Art Company opened under co-CEO Pyo In-bong, with a focus on producing theatrical works. The company's first venture was a production of the American musical comedy Xanadu, starring Super Junior members Heechul and Kangin.

2010–2012: Joint and further ventures

In February 2010, after two decades on SM's board of directors, founder Lee Soo-man resigned from his position in order to "focus more energy on SM's overseas business, new business management, and artist development." In March of the same year, KMP Holdings was established as a joint venture between SM, YG Entertainment, JYP Entertainment, Star Empire, Medialine, CAN Entertainment, and Music Factory. The firm's first release from SM was Super Junior's fifth studio album, Mr. Simple, which marked the end of SM's self-distribution. In May, SM announced its highest ever first quarter operating profits, at KR, up 471% from the same period the previous year. Gross revenue was reported at KR, a 58% increase on the previous year.

In April 2011, SM, YG, JYP, KeyEast, AMENT, and Star J Entertainment came together to form United Asia Management, a joint investment agency geared towards advancing Asian music worldwide. That August, SM joined with Thai media company TrueVisions to create an international joint venture, SM True.

In 2012, SM debuted the large-scale boy group Exo, split into two units in order to promote in Korea and China simultaneously. In February, SM acquired Hawaiian travel firm Happy Hawaii and launched SMTown Travel, a new business initiative specializing in travel and tourism under Kang Jung-hyun. Later that year, SMTown Travel offered package deals for overseas fans attending Super Junior's Super Show 4 Tour encore concerts in Seoul. In March, 47 of SM's recording artists became stockholders of the company. Kangta, BoA, and most members of Super Junior and Girls’ Generation received 680 shares each (with a value of approximately US$27,200 per person), while members of more recent groups like Shinee and f(x) received 340 shares each (with a value of around US$13,600 per person). In August, SM held an art exhibition at the COEX Convention & Exhibition Center, and collaborated with Visa and KB Kookmin Card to begin printing SM artist cards. That same month, Korean TV personalities Kang Ho-dong and Shin Dong-yup announced that they had signed exclusive contracts with SM's new broadcasting subsidiary, SM Culture & Contents (SM C&C), marking SM's expansion into television. The next month, in September, SM C&C merged with AM Entertainment (which then represented top actors such as Jang Dong-gun, Kim Ha-neul, and Han Ji-min), and two other TV personalities, Lee Su-geun and Kim Byung-man, announced that they had also signed with SM. In November, KMP Holdings was acquired by KT Music, and in June 2013, KT Music absorbed KMP's distribution network.

2013–2016: Third-generation artists and new music ventures

In 2013, SM C&C acquired Hoon Media (a production company led by Lee Hoon-hee, responsible for KBS serials 1 vs 100, Heroines 6, Qualifications of Men, and Music Bank) and Woollim Entertainment, a record label responsible for artists such as Infinite.

In January 2014, SM and the other six talent agencies behind KMP Holdings formed a collective bond partnership and bought 13.48% of KT Music's stocks, leaving parent KT Corporation with 49.99%. In February, SM acquired a share in Baljunso, an indie record label founded in 1991 by Kang Byung-yong. On August 1, SM debuted Red Velvet, its first girl group since f(x) five years prior.

In August 2015, SM partnered with sports marketing company IB Worldwide to create Galaxia SM, responsible for golfer Park In-bee, gymnast Son Yeon-jae, and Choo Shin-soo, right fielder for the Texas Rangers. On November 6, the 10th anniversary of Super Junior's debut, SM announced the creation of the group's own sub-label, Label SJ. In late 2015, SM partnered with modeling company ESteem to promote self-owned content and network.[38] The venture later expanded its acting division through the acting debuts of models Ki Do-hoon and Lee Cheol-woo. In 2015, SM had reported revenues of KR₩325 billion (approximately US$287 million) and a net income of KR₩21.7 billion (US$19 million).

In January 2016, founder Lee Soo-man held a conference at the SM Coex Artium, announcing plans for a new boy group, NCT an acronym for Neo Culture Technology, with "unlimited members". Its first sub-unit, NCT U, released two debut singles in April 2016. NCT has since expanded to three more units - NCT 127 in July 2016, NCT Dream in August 2016, and the China-based unit WayV in January 2019. The sub-label Label V manages WayV. With members debuting yearly from 2016 to 2020, NCT as a whole currently has 23 members.

At the beginning of 2016, the company opened a restaurant, SMT Seoul, and also established a series of stores selling branded foods under the name SUM Market. On February 11, 2016, the Chinese e-commerce giant Alibaba Group acquired a 4% minority stake in SM Entertainment for US$30 million. On May 5, 2016, SM released the first single under its newly established EDM label ScreaM Records, "Wave", featuring f(x) members Amber and Luna and produced by Xavi & Gi and E-mart's Electro Mart. ScreaM Records opened as part of SM's New Culture Technology 2016 project, under which SM also initiated the digital music channel SM Station and a number of mobile apps. In late 2016, SM began organizing a League of Legends tournament, called SM Super Celeb League, in which SM artists Heechul and Baekhyun played against both professional gamers and fans from South Korea and China.

2017–2022: NCT expansion, business expansion and the end of "SM 2.0" era
On February 16, 2017, a source from the task force in charge of the international K-pop academy has plans to open this upcoming September. The Gangnam-based academy is a collaborative venture with the private Jongro Sky Academy. Plans for the school to be certified as an alternative program for domestic Korean middle and high school education, as well as US secondary school education, are also underway. In March 2017, SM acquired the independent record label Mystic Entertainment, becoming the label's largest shareholder.

In March 2018, SM acquired entertainment agency KeyEast and drama production company FNC Add Culture, a subsidiary of FNC Entertainment. Two months later, FNC Add Culture changed their name to SM Life Design Group. On October 2, 2018 it was revealed SM had acquired Million Market, home to singer-song writers, rappers and R&B singers. In October 2018, SM partnered up with Trans Media of Indonesia, which was owned by CT Corp. In February 2019, Trans Media and SM signed their Heads of Joint Venture Agreement together. Later, on the same month, SM opened its Indonesian office in Jakarta.

In January 2019, SM debuted NCT's China unit, boy group band WayV. On August 8, 2019, SM and Capitol Music Group – which earlier signed NCT 127 in April 2019 – announced SuperM, a supergroup consisting of Taemin from Shinee, Baekhyun and Kai from Exo, and Taeyong, Ten, Lucas and Mark from NCT units NCT 127, NCT Dream and WayV, in the 2019 Capitol Congress event in Los Angeles. The group debuted in October 2019. The group's self-titled EP entered the Billboard 200 albums chart at number one, making SuperM the first Asian artist in history to top the US album chart with a debut release. In November 2019, SM signed with Creative Artists Agency for representation in all areas. In March 2020, SM appointed production head Lee Sung Soo as the company's CEO, as well as Tak Young Joon as SM's chief marketing officer (CMO).

By April 2020, it was announced that SM and Naver had signed a Memorandum of Understanding (MOU) with purpose to expand the reach of concerts to global audience. The joint efforts leads to the creation of Beyond Live, a series of online live concerts, which were created in light of the ongoing COVID-19 pandemic. On April 20, SM released the first trailer on their official YouTube channel announcing the upcoming series of live concerts dubbed as the "new era of live concert", with the first live show to be headlined by SuperM. The concerts are hosted on Naver's V Live app and made available to audience from more than 200 countries. On August 3, Naver invested ₩100 billion in SM. This would be used for their subsidiaries SMEJ Plus and Mystic Story, as well as plans for merging their fanclubs into V Live's Fanship platform and developing more Beyond Live concerts. A day later, SM announced its partnership with JYP Entertainment to establish Beyond Live Corporation, a joint company for producing Beyond Live concerts. SM Coex Artium closed in June 2020. A venue located in Changwon, which has been planned since 2016, will replace it. On June 12, it was announced that SM partnered with Seoul Philharmonic Orchestra to release orchestral versions of their artists' most popular songs under the label SM Classics. In October 2020, SM announced that Aespa, their first new girl group in six years, would debut with their digital single "Black Mamba" on November 17. 

On May 7, 2021, SM announced they would develop a competition series to scout young American men to form a U.S.-based K-pop group. On December 27, 2021, SM announced the creation of their rotational all-female supergroup Girls On Top. The group's first lineup, Got the Beat, consists of BoA, Taeyeon and Hyoyeon from Girls' Generation, Seulgi and Wendy from Red Velvet, and Karina and Winter from Aespa. The group released their debut single "Step Back" on January 3, 2022. In 2022, SM terminated its production license contract with founder Lee Soo-man's company Like Planning. On December 1, SM announced that the company will be setting up its Southeast Asian headquarters in Singapore, which will be managing joint ventures in Indonesia, Thailand and Vietnam. The company plans to launch retail businesses such as cafes, merchandise stores and pop-up exhibitions in the country.

2023–present: Announcing "SM 3.0" era and major adjustments

On February 3, 2023, SM released a video titled "SM 3.0: Producing Strategy Multi 'Production Center/Label' System" on their official YouTube channel, in which co-CEOs Lee Sung-soo and Tak Young-jun revealed that the label is passing from its "2.0" era to the "3.0 era", with major adjustments to come concerning the label's operations. These include shifting from a one-man production system led by founder and executive producer Lee Soo-man and his private production house to a system under which multiple production teams, both internal and external, would supervise music production and artist promotions. A goal of the new system is to avoid production delays. In the video, Lee and Tak also shared that SM will debut four new artists in 2023, including a new girl group managed by Lee, virtual soloist Naevis managed by Park Joon-young, and the Japanese unit of NCT and a new boy group managed by Tak. On February 6, 2023, it was announced that Kakao had purchased a 9.05% stake of SM Entertainment, becoming the company's second-largest shareholder at the time. A day later, Lee Soo-man filed a lawsuit against SM Entertainment, citing the deal between SM and Kakao is "illegal" without his permission as a largest shareholder. On February 9, it was announced that Hybe Corporation had become SM Entertainment's largest shareholder after acquiring a 14.8% stake from Lee Soo-man for approximately 422.8 billion won, with the company subsequently acquiring Galaxia SM's 1% stake on March 3, increasing their share to 15.8%. On March 3, South Korean court  issued an injunction against SM Entertainment deal with Kakao. On March 6, Kakao launch a takeover bid, in which it acquires 35% of SM Entertainment's shares. On March 12, HYBE announced that they no longer planned to own the majority stakes of SM Entertainment, said that the bidding war with Kakao could "damage shareholder value."

Subsidiaries 

Divisions
 SM Studios
 SM C&C (since 2012)
 SM Life Design Group (2018)
 Dear U (2017)
 Mystic Story (since 2017)
 KEYEAST (since 2018)
 Dream Maker Entertainment (2006)
 SM Brand Marketing (2008)
 ESteem (since 2015)
 Galaxia SM (since 2015)
 SM Town Planner (2017)
 Studio Kwangya (2022)

Branches
 SM Japan (2001)
 SM USA (2008)
 SM True (2011), joint venture with True Corporation of Thailand
 SM Entertainment Indonesia (2019), joint venture with Trans Media of Indonesia
 SM Entertainment Vietnam (2020)

Label
 Woollim Entertainment (2013)
 Baljunso (2014)
 Label SJ (2015), exclusive label to manage Super Junior
 ScreaM Records (2016), exclusive EDM label
 Million Market (since 2018)
 Label V (2019), exclusive label to manage WayV activities in China.
 All I Know Music (AIKM), previously music label under Mystic before became a label under SM since 2019.
 SM Classics (2020), partnered with Seoul Philharmonic Orchestra.

Artists

Discography

Filmography

Controversies

Contractual disputes

JYJ (TVXQ)
In late July 2009, three of the five original members of SM boy group TVXQ – Kim Jaejoong, Park Yoochun, and Kim Junsu – applied to the Seoul Central District Court to investigate the validity of their contract with SM, as they felt the thirteen-year contract was excessively long and that earnings were not fairly distributed to the members, but contract destruction, they shall be compensated to the Employer by three times the total investment amount and two times the ordinary profit during the remaining contract period. The news of this dispute caused SM's KOSPI stock price to drop by 10.06%. In addition, 120,000 fans of TVXQ filed a petition against SM's long-term contracts to the Seoul Central District Court, and also filed for compensation for an SMTown Live Concert that was canceled a week before its scheduled date.

Their statement read, "(They) have had health problems and finally reached their physical limits, but SM continued to send them abroad and plan excessive activities. Thus, the three members have started to hope they will be able to continue their careers as they wish, instead of being used as tools for the agency's profits."

The court ruled in the favour of the three ex-members. In response, SM held a press conference claiming that the lawsuit was fraudulent, and filed an injunction. In early May 2010, it was announced that Jaejoong, Yoochun, and Junsu would return to the stage as JYJ under a new management agency, C-JeS Entertainment. The injunction was dismissed by the Seoul Central District Court on February 17, 2011, and the final decision on the case was postponed indefinitely for mediation under the justice department.

On November 28, 2012, during a voluntary arbitration at the Seoul Central District Court, SM and JYJ reached a mutual agreement to terminate all contracts between the two parties and not to interfere with each other's activities in the future, concluding the lawsuit. SM reportedly stated that they had decided to end the litigation "to avoid bringing additional harm to U-Know Yunho and Max Changmin, who are active as TVXQ, and to avoid making any more unneeded issues."

Han Geng
On December 21, 2009, five months after the three former TVXQ members filed their lawsuit and while the dispute was still active, Han Geng, the only Chinese member of Super Junior, also filed a lawsuit against SM. Han Geng filed for similar reasons: unfair profit distribution, and an unfair thirteen-year contract that contained provisions in SM's favor that he was not allowed to revise or end. The artist's friend and later manager Sun Le also submitted a statement to the Korean courts citing SM's violation of Han Geng's rights, which was later leaked via the internet. The statement argued that SM had discriminated against Han Geng financially as well as in terms of management.

On September 27, 2011, Han Geng's departure from Super Junior was made official when legal representatives of both Han Geng and SM released a joint statement saying that "Han Geng and SM Entertainment have amicably settled on a mutual agreement, and the lawsuit was able to come to a close after Han Geng submitted his 'Notice of Withdrawal of Appeal.'"

Kris Wu
On May 15, 2014, Kris Wu, a Chinese-Canadian member of Exo, filed a lawsuit to terminate his contract with SM, as first reported by Chinese news portal Sina. He was represented by Cho Bum-suk, the same lawyer that handled Han Geng's case. Kris, whose real name is Wu Yifan, was quoted as saying, "The company has treated me like a machine part or as an object of control rather than presenting a vision as an entertainer." He left the group in the same month that the lawsuit was made public, while the rest of the group continued to promote their single "Overdose." On July 21, 2016, Kris officially parted ways with EXO, although his contract with SM remains valid until 2022.

Jessica Jung
On September 29, 2014, Girls' Generation member Jessica Jung claimed in a Weibo post that she had been forced out of the group, writing:I was excited about our upcoming fan events only to shockingly be informed by my company and 8 others that as of today, I'm no longer a member. I'm devastated – my priority and love is to serve as a member of GG, but for no justifiable reason, I am being forced out.The following day, Jung released a statement claiming that in August 2014 her fellow group members and SM had been positive about the launch of her fashion business, Blanc and Eclare. As of early September, she claimed, they had all changed their stance, and she was directed to either close the business or cease promotions as a member of Girls' Generation. She claimed to have received the day before a "one-sided notice" asking her to leave the group.

However, according to SM, Jung had unilaterally informed them in early spring that she would leave the group after one more album. But before agreements could be made, she had set up her independent business, which caused problems for the group's professional schedules. This prompted management to begin promoting Girls' Generation as eight members rather than nine, with the intention of announcing the news; however, Jung had already "posted her own perspective". The company then stated that the group would henceforth continue as eight, while they would still manage Jung's individual schedule. In the days immediately after this news came to light, company stocks dropped by KR₩3,350 per share, from KR₩40,750 to KR₩37,400, losing SM a total of KR₩69 billion (approximately US$65 million).

On August 6, 2015, Jung and SM reached an agreement to terminate her contract, with Jung stating, "This release is to confirm that SM Entertainment ('SM') and I have officially parted ways. I will cherish the many years we spent and I wish SM the best of luck in all of its endeavors."

Lu Han
On October 10, 2014, Lu Han became the second Chinese member of Exo to file to nullify his contract with SM and leave the group, just over four months after Kris had done the same. His lawsuit included the claim that SM had favored the Korean sub-unit Exo-K over the Chinese sub-unit Exo-M. Within 15 minutes of the announcement, company stocks had dropped by 9.41%, from KR₩37,000 to KR₩33,250 per share. The stock's worth contracted by 15%, hitting the maximum decrease in price KOSDAQ allows for a day, and falling to a more-than-one-year low. On July 21, 2016, Lu Han officially parted ways with Exo, although his contract with SM remains valid until 2022.

No Min-woo
In April 2015, No Min-woo, a former member of TRAX, filed a lawsuit against SM for subjecting him to an unlawful seventeen-year contract. No alleged that SM had also interfered with his career after he had left the company, and sought KR₩100 million in damages. No lost his lawsuit against SM on July 21, 2016.

Huang Zitao
On August 24, 2015, Tao became the third Chinese member of Exo to file against SM and leave the group, being represented by the same legal team that represented former members Kris and Lu Han. On January 5, 2016, SM won one of its counter-lawsuits against Tao per the ruling of the Intermediate People's Court in Qingdao, China. The agency sued Tao over his failure to repay the company after his departure. They released an official statement saying, "SM has ongoing lawsuits against Exo members Wu Yifan (Kris), Luhan, and Tao for violating their exclusive contracts and partaking in illegal promotions in China. Among these lawsuits, SM filed a lawsuit against Tao for failing to repay SM on October 13, 2015. An intermediate court in Qingdao, China made the verdict that Tao is to repay SM as well as interest for the delayed payment."

2009 MAMA Awards boycott
On November 21, 2009, SM boycotted the Mnet Asian Music Awards event, claiming reservations regarding the standard of fairness and the criteria used in Mnet's selections for award recipients. The company specifically mentioned Girls' Generation, who had topped Korean music charts for nine consecutive weeks and had won numerous awards for their single "Gee", but had never won on Mnet's weekly M Countdown show, and had only appeared on their charts a month after the album release. SM also cited the fact that voters had to pay a fee, saying that they "did not want to see fans suffer any damage from the poll, which has commercial intentions."

Fair Trade Commission scrutiny
In 2010, the Korea Fair Trade Commission (KFTC) undertook an investigation into SM's policies, especially regarding artists' contract terms, and concluded that they were unfair. Artist contracts were subsequently reduced by a length of three years, and there was a reduction in the penalties for breach-of-contract violations. All the artists signed under SM at the time re-contracted with the agency under the new terms.

SM was also one of fifteen companies sued and fined by the KFTC for price rigging in 2011. 

In 2012, SM was accused of colluding with music distributors, but was cleared of the charge. On August 16, the Seoul High Court revealed their verdict on the issue: "The KFTC has canceled all corrective orders against SM, and the lawsuit costs will be paid by the defendant."

Philanthropy 
On February 13, 2023, SM donated 200 million won to help in 2023 Turkey–Syria earthquake through Hope Bridge National Disaster Relief Association.

Notes

References

External links

 
 

 
Companies based in Seoul
Companies listed on KOSDAQ
Electronic dance music record labels
Entertainment companies established in 1995
Event management companies of South Korea
Film distributors of South Korea
Film production companies of South Korea
Hip hop record labels
Music production companies
Music publishing companies of South Korea
K-pop record labels
Publishing companies established in 1995
Record labels established in 1995
Soul music record labels
South Korean companies established in 1995
South Korean brands
South Korean record labels
Synth-pop record labels
Talent agencies of South Korea